Sources disagree as to the current population of Eritrea, with some proposing numbers as low as 3.6 million and others as high as 6.7 million. Eritrea has never conducted an official government census.

The nation has nine recognized ethnic groups. Of these, the largest is the Tigriniya, who make up 50% of the population; the Tigre people, who also speak a Semitic language, constitute around 30% of residents. Most of the rest of the population belong to other Afro-Asiatic-speaking communities of the Cushitic branch. Additionally, there are a number of Nilo-Saharan-speaking ethnic minorities and other smaller groups.
 
The two most followed religions are Christianity (47%-63% of the total population) and Islam (37%-52%).

Ethno-linguistic groups

Eritrea's population comprises nine recognized ethnic groups, most of whom speak languages from the Ethiopian Semitic branch of the Afro-Asiatic family. The East African Semitic languages spoken in Eritrea are Tigre, Tigrinya, and the newly recognized Dahlik. Other Afro-Asiatic languages belonging to the Cushitic branch are also widely spoken in the country. The latter include Afar, Beja, Blin, and Saho.

In addition, languages belonging to the Nilo-Saharan language family (Kunama and Nara) are spoken as a mother tongue by the Kunama and Nara Nilotic ethnic minorities that live in the north and northwestern part of the country. The Rashaida speak Arabic, while there are also a number of Italians who speak their native Italian language.

Afro-Asiatic communities

Semitic speakers

Tigrinya

The majority of the Tigrinya inhabit the highlands of Eritrea; however, migration to other parts of the country has occurred. Their language is called Tigrinya. They are the largest ethnic group in the country, constituting about 50% of the population. The predominantly Tigrinya populated urban centers in Eritrea are the capital Asmara, Mendefera, Dekemhare, Adi Keyh, Adi Quala and Senafe, while there is a significant population of Tigrinya in other cities including Keren, and Massawa.

They are 92% Christians, (of which 90% are of the Eritrean Orthodox faith, 5% Roman Catholic and Eastern Catholic (whose mass is held in Ge'ez as opposed to Latin), and 5% belonging to various Protestant and other Christian denominations, the majority of which belong to the (Lutheran) Evangelical Church of Eritrea).

Tigre

The Tigre reside in the western lowlands in Eritrea. Many also migrated to Sudan at the time of the Ethiopian-Eritrean conflict and lived there since. They are a nomadic and pastoralist people, related to the Tigrinya and to the Beja people. They are a predominantly Muslim nomadic people who inhabit the northern, western, and coastal lowlands of Eritrea, where they constitute 30% of local residents. Some also inhabit areas in eastern Sudan. 95% of the Tigre people adhere to the Islamic religion Sunni Islam, but there are a small number of Christians among them as well (often referred to as the Mensaï in Eritrea). Their language is called Tigre.

Rashaida

The Rashaida are one of Eritrea's nine recognized ethnic groups. They represent around 1% of the population of Eritrea. The Rashaida reside in the northern coastal lowlands of Eritrea and the northern eastern coasts of Sudan. They are predominantly Muslim and are the only ethnic group in Eritrea to have Arabic as their communal language, specifically the Hejazi dialect. The Rashaida first came to Eritrea in the 19th century from the Arabian Coast.

Jeberti
The Jeberti people in Eritrea trace descent from early Muslim adherents. The term Jeberti is also locally sometimes used to generically refer to all Islamic inhabitants of the highlands. The Jeberti in Eritrea speak Arabic and Tigrinya. They account for about 8% of the Tigrinya speakers in the nation.

Cushitic speakers

Afar

According to the CIA, the Afar constitute 4% of the nation's population. They live in the Debubawi Keyih Bahri Region of Eritrea, as well as the Afar Region in Ethiopia, and Djibouti. They speak the Afar language as a mother tongue, and are predominantly Muslim. Afars in Eritrea number about 600,000 individuals, the smallest population out of the countries they reside in. In Djibouti, there are about 780,000 group members, and in Ethiopia, they number approximately 2,100,000.

Saho

The Saho represent 4% of Eritrea's population. They principally reside in the Debubawi Keyih Bahri Region and the Northern Red Sea Region of Eritrea. Their language is called Saho. They are predominantly Muslim, although a few Christians known as the Irob live in the Debub Region of Eritrea and the Tigray region of Ethiopia.

Bilen

The Bilen in Eritrea represent around 3% of the country's population. They are primarily concentrated in the north-central areas, in and around the city of Keren, and south towards Asmara, the nation's capital. Many of them entered Eritrea from Kush (central Sudan) in the 8th century and settled at Merara, after which they went to Lalibela and Lasta. The Bilen then returned to Axum in Ethiopia's Tigray Province, and battled with the natives; in the resulting aftermath, the Bilen returned to their main base at Merara. The Bilen include adherents of both Islam and Christianity. They speak the Bilen as a mother tongue. Christian adherents are mainly urban and have interbred with the Tigrinya who live in the area. Muslim adherents are mainly rural and have intermingled with the adjacent Tigre.

Beja

The Beja in Eritrea, or Hedareb, constitute 2% of local residents. They mainly live along the north-western border with Sudan. Group members are predominantly Muslim and communicate in Hedareb as a first or second language. The Beja also include the Beni-Amer people, who have retained their native Beja language alongside Hedareb.

Nilo-Saharan communities

Kunama

According to the CIA, the Kunama constitute around 4% of Eritrea's population. They mainly live in the country's Gash Barka Region, as well as in adjacent parts of Ethiopia's Tigray Region. Many of them reside in the contested border village of Badme. Their language is called Kunama. Although some Kunama still practice traditional beliefs, most are converts to either Christianity (Roman Catholic and Protestant) or Islam.

Nara

The Nara represent 2% of the nation's population. They principally reside along the south-western border with Sudan and Ethiopia. They are generally Muslim, with a few Christians and some practising their indigenous beliefs. Their language is called Nara.

Other communities

Italians

A few monolingual Italian Eritreans remain. As of 2008, they were estimated at 900 people, down from around 38,000 residents at the end of World War II.

Religion

People in Eritrea practice various religions. According to the Pew Research Center (2010), 62.9% of the population are Christian, mostly followers of Eritrean Orthodox Tewahdo, and to a lesser extent, Roman Catholicism, with the second-largest religion being Muslims. In general, most local residents who adhere to Christianity live in the Maekel and Debub regions, whereas those who follow Islam predominantly inhabit the Anseba, Northern Red Sea, Southern Red Sea and Gash-Barka regions. A few adherents of traditional faiths can also be found, particularly in the lowlands.

Population
Sources disagree as to the current population of Eritrea, with UN DESA proposing a low estimate of 3.6 million for 2021 and the Common Market for Eastern and Southern Africa proposing a high estimate of 6.7 million for 2019. Eritrea has never conducted an official government census. In its 2019 data release, UN DESA described why its estimate was much lower than earlier estimates, stating, "The decrease is due to the availability of new official population estimates for several years (population count in 2000, official estimates up to 2018) that contribute to lower the size of the population in the recent years, as well as to revised past estimates since 1950."

In the 2010s, worsening conditions fueled migration pressure, with Eritreans trying to reach Europe illegally. The UN Department of Economic and Social Affairs expects Eritrean population growth to accelerate to 1.8% per year from 2020-2030, vs. 1.1% per year from 2010-2020.

The proportion of children below the age of 15 in 2020 was 41.1%, 54.3% were between 15 and 65 years of age, while 4.5% were 65 or older.

Population Estimates by Sex and Age Group (1 July 2020):

Vital statistics

Demographic surveys
The United Nations Department of Economic and Social Affairs (UN DESA) Population Division published its UN DESA 2019 Revision (World Population Prospects 2019) data release based on several data samples, including the 1995 and 2002 Demographic and Health Surveys (1995 DHS, 2002 DHS) and the 2010 Population and Health Survey (2010 PHS), since a full census had not been carried out in Eritrea .

The 1995 DHS survey was carried out in Eritrea by the Eritrean National Statistics Office (NSO) and Macro International Inc., collecting data by interviewing 5,054 women aged 15–49 and 1,114 men aged 15–59, chosen to be a statistically representative sample, from September 1995 to January 1996.

The 2002 DHS survey was carried out by the NSO (renamed as the National Statistics and Evaluation Office), with support from the United States Agency for International Development (USAID) and ORC Macro, collecting data with interviews of 8,754 women in Eritrea in the 15–49 age range, in what was considered to be a statistically representative sample of the full population. Key findings of the survey included a drop from 1995 to 2002 of fertility from 6.1 to 4.8 children per woman; improved knowledge of contraception; a drop in post-neonatal mortality; improved antenatal care; a doubling of the full vaccination rate for 12–23 month old babies from 41 to 76 percent; 38 percent of children under five years old were chronically malnourished or stunted; and near universal knowledge of HIV and AIDS.

In 2010, the NSO, supported by the Fafo Institute for Applied International Studies, published a Population and Health Survey (EPHS2010), based on a survey covering 34,423 households by choosing 900 areas around Eritrea, 525 rural and 375 urban, and randomly selecting 40 households in each cluster. Interviews aimed to include all women aged 15–49 and men aged 15–59 who were either residents or visitors in any selected household on the night preceding the interview. Key findings compared to the 1995 DHS survey included a decrease in early childhood mortality, increased children's vaccination, decreased maternal death, and a "wide gap between knowledge and use of family planning".

Fertility and mortality

Urban/rural and geographical distribution
Total Fertility Rate (TFR) (Wanted Fertility Rate) and Crude Birth Rate (CBR) (1995 DHS, Table 3.1; 2002 DHS, Table 4.1;)

Fertility geographical distribution as of 2010 (PHS, Table 4-2):

Life expectancy

Migration

In 2015, there was a major outflow of emigrants from Eritrea. The Guardian attributed the emigration to Eritrea being "a totalitarian state where most citizens fear arrest at any moment and dare not speak to their neighbours, gather in groups or linger long outside their homes", with a major factor being the conditions and long durations of conscription in the Eritrean Army. At the end of 2018, the United Nations High Commissioner for Refugees (UNHCR) estimated that about 507,300 Eritreans were refugees who had fled Eritrea. Factors corresponding to emigration include the "lack of political, religious and social freedom", economic reasons and indefinite military service. Young people choosing to flee Eritrea often keep their plans secret from their families in order to decrease their families' stress and risk of being fined or imprisoned. Payment to people smugglers is typically made when a refugee arrives in Libya and provides the smugglers with a telephone number of a diaspora contact who is expected to pay. Several refugees given educational opportunities while residing in refugee camps in Ethiopia felt that they lacked long-term life opportunities beyond obtaining academic degrees, motivating them to attempt further emigration to Europe.

During the first four half decades of the twenty-first century, UN DESA Population Division, in its 2019 Revision of World Population Prospects, estimated that Eritrea had 227 thousand more immigrants than emigrants during 2000–2005 (more people arrived than left), and had net outflows afterwards, with 80 thousand net emigrants during 2005–2010, 246 thousand during 2010–2015 and 199 thousand during 2015-2020.

Demographic statistics
Demographic statistics according to the World Population Review in 2022.

One birth every 5 minutes	
One death every 22 minutes	
One net migrant every 25 minutes	
Net gain of one person every 9 minutes

The following demographic statistics are from the CIA World Factbook.

Population
6,209,262 (2022 est.)

Age structure

0-14 years: 38.23% (male 1,169,456/female 1,155,460)
15-24 years: 20.56% (male 622,172/female 627,858)
25-54 years: 33.42% (male 997,693/female 1,034,550)
55-64 years: 3.8% (male 105,092/female 125,735)
65 years and over: 4% (male 99,231/female 143,949) (2020 est.)

0-14 years: 39.53% (male 1,186,749 /female 1,173,530)
15-24 years: 19.94% (male 592,365 /female 598,305)
25-54 years: 32.88% (male 965,405 /female 997,771)
55-64 years: 3.7% (male 96,967 /female 123,895)
65 years and over: 3.95% (male 97,816 /female 137,843) (2018 est.)

0–14 years: 42.9% (male 1,085,116/female 1,072,262) 
15–64 years: 53.5% (male 1,332,349/female 1,355,494) 
65 years and over: 3.6% (male 88,068/female 95,186) (2008 est.)

Total fertility rate
3.58 children born/woman (2022 est.) Country comparison to the world: 35th
3.9 children born/woman (2018 est.) Country comparison to the world: 37th
According to 2002 official survey, fertility rate was 4.8 with 3.5 in urban and 5.7 in rural.

Birth rate
27.04 births/1,000 population (2022 est.) Country comparison to the world: 40th
29.1 births/1,000 population (2018 est.) Country comparison to the world: 40th

Death rate
6.69 deaths/1,000 population (2022 est.) Country comparison to the world: 130th
7.1 deaths/1,000 population (2018 est.) Country comparison to the world: 126th

Population growth rate
1.03% (2022 est.) Country comparison to the world: 93rd
0.89% (2018 est.) Country comparison to the world: 123rd
2.445% (2011 est.)

Median age
total: 20.3 years. Country comparison to the world: 192nd
male: 19.7 years
female: 20.8 years (2020 est.)

total: 19.9 years Country comparison to the world: 194th
male: 19.4 years 
female: 20.4 years (2018 est.)

Mother's mean age at first birth
21.3 years (2010 est.)
note: median age at first birth among women 25-29

Contraceptive prevalence rate
8.4% (2010)

Net migration rate
-10.11 migrant(s)/1,000 population (2022 est.) Country comparison to the world: 221st
-13.9 migrant(s)/1,000 population (2017 est.) Country comparison to the world: 215th

Dependency ratios
total dependency ratio: 85 (2015 est.)
youth dependency ratio: 78.3 (2015 est.)
elderly dependency ratio: 6.8 (2015 est.)
potential support ratio: 14.8 (2015 est.)

Urbanization

urban population: 42.6% of total population (2022)
rate of urbanization: 3.67% annual rate of change (2020-25 est.)

urban population: 40.1% of total population (2018)
rate of urbanization: 3.86% annual rate of change (2015-20 est.)

Sex ratio
at birth:
1.03 male(s)/female
under 15 years:
1.01 male(s)/female
15–64 years:
0.98 male(s)/female
65 years and over:
0.93 male(s)/female
total population:
0.99 male(s)/female (2008 est.)

Life expectancy at birth
total population: 66.85 years. Country comparison to the world: 195th
male: 64.25 years
female: 69.53 years (2022 est.)

total population: 65.6 years (2018 est.)
male: 63 years (2018 est.)
female: 68.2 years (2018 est.)

Nationality
noun:
Eritrean(s)
adjective:
Eritrean

Ethnic groups
Tigrinya 55%, Tigre 30%, Saho 4%, Kunama 2%, Rashaida 2%, Bilen 2%, other (Afar, Beni-Amer, Nera) 5% (2010 est.)

Religion
Eritrean Orthodox Tewahedo Church, Sunni Islam, Eritrean Catholic Church, Protestantism in Eritrea

Languages
Afar, Arabic (spoken by the Rashaida), Beja (spoken by the Hedareb), Blin, Kunama, Nara, Saho, Tigre, Tigrinya, as a second language. English, Italian and Arabic are the foremost second languages.

Literacy
definition: age 15 and over can read and write (2015 est.)
total population: 73.8% (2015 est.)
male: 82.4% (2015 est.)
female: 65.5% (2015 est.)

School life expectancy (primary to tertiary education)
total: 5 years (2015)
male: 6 years (2015)
female: 5 years (2015)

Major infectious diseases
degree of risk: high (2020)
food or waterborne diseases: bacterial diarrhea, hepatitis A, and typhoid fever
vectorborne diseases: malaria and dengue fever

See also

 Languages of Eritrea
 Culture of Eritrea

References

Attribution:

External links

Languages in Eritrea
Ethnic groups in Eritrea
Eritrean website featuring resources relevant to Tigre history and culture

Society of Eritrea